Tyler A. Clark is an American politician from Maine. A Republican, Clark served in the Maine House of Representatives from 2008 until 2014. He ran unsuccessfully in 2006. He earned a B.A. from the University of Maine at Presque Isle in 2008, and a Masters in Business from New England College of Business  During his second and third term in the Legislature, Clark was a member of the influential Appropriations and Financial Affairs Committee.

Citing the low pay for state legislators, Clark announced in July 2014 that he would not seek a 4th term in the Maine House.

References

Year of birth missing (living people)
Living people
People from Aroostook County, Maine
Republican Party members of the Maine House of Representatives
University of Maine at Presque Isle alumni